Vasyl Shuptar (born January 27, 1991, in Lviv) is a Ukrainian male freestyle wrestler. He is medalist of all the major competitions in wrestling.

References 
 bio on unitedworldwrestling.org

Living people
1991 births
Sportspeople from Lviv
Ukrainian male sport wrestlers
World Wrestling Championships medalists
European Games bronze medalists for Ukraine
Universiade medalists in wrestling
Universiade bronze medalists for Ukraine
European Games medalists in wrestling
European Wrestling Championships medalists
Medalists at the 2013 Summer Universiade
Wrestlers at the 2015 European Games